Dutch Malacca (1641–1825) was the longest period that Malacca was under foreign control. The Dutch ruled for almost 183 years with intermittent British occupation during the Napoleonic Wars (1795–1815). This era saw relative peace with little serious interruption from the Malay sultanates due to the understanding forged between the Dutch and the Sultanate of Johor in 1606. This time also marked the decline of the importance of Malacca. The Dutch preferred Batavia (present-day Jakarta) as their economic and administrative centre in the region and their hold in Malacca was to prevent the loss of the city to other European powers and, subsequently, the competition that would come with it. Thus, in the 17th century, with Malacca ceased to be an important port, the Johor Sultanate became the dominant local power in the region due to the opening of its ports and the alliance with the Dutch.

Dutch conquest of Portuguese Malacca

In the early 17th century, the Dutch East India Company began the campaign to usurp Portuguese power in the East. At that time, the Portuguese had transformed Malacca into an impregnable fortress (the Fortaleza de Malaca), controlling access to the sea lanes of the Straits of Malacca and the spice trade there. The Dutch started by launching small incursions and skirmishes against the Portuguese. The first serious attempt was the siege of Malacca in 1606 by the third VOC fleet from the Dutch Republic with eleven ships, under Admiral Cornelis Matelief de Jonge that led to the naval battle of Cape Rachado. Although the Dutch were routed, the Portuguese fleet of Martim Afonso de Castro, the Viceroy of Goa, suffered heavier casualties and the battle rallied the forces of the Sultanate of Johor in an alliance with the Dutch and later on with the Acehnese.

The Dutch along with their local Javanese allies numbered around 700 men, assaulted and wrested Malacca from the Portuguese in January 1641. Assistance was also provided to the Dutch also received help from the Johor Sultanate of around an additional 500–600 men. The Dutch also received supplies and rations from nearby and their recently-captured base of Batavia. The campaign effectively destroyed the last bastion of Portuguese power, removing their influence in the Malay archipelago. As per the agreement with Johor in 1606, the Dutch took control of Malacca and agreed not to seek territories or wage war with the Malay kingdoms.

Administration of Malacca

Malacca was controlled as a colony of the VOC. All the chief administrators of Malacca were Dutch governors except for the brief period that the city was under British Residents during the Napoleonic Wars. However, focus on the administration of Malacca eventually waned by the Dutch as they preferred to focus on Batavia. The governors and residents list is as follows:

Governors of Malacca

The town and fortress of Malacca
The Dutch improved and expanded the Portuguese fortress as well as renovating the fortress' gate in 1670, they further built walls to protect the harbour and expanded city. During the mid-17th century the city hall or Stadthuys was constructed and served as the administrative center of the Dutch colony, the building still stands today.

See also
 Dutch Graveyard

References

Further reading
 

.Dutch Malacca
Malacca, Dutch
Malacca, Dutch
Former countries in Malaysian history
Malacca, Dutch
Former trading posts of the Dutch East India Company
Former settlements and colonies of the Dutch East India Company
Malaysia–Netherlands relations
States and territories established in 1641
States and territories disestablished in 1825
1641 establishments in the Dutch Empire
1825 disestablishments in the Dutch Empire
1641 establishments in Asia
1825 disestablishments in Asia